Jon Ragel, better known by his stage name Boy Eats Drum Machine, is an American solo artist who was originally based in Portland, Oregon, but who moved to Santa Cruz in 2014. He has been described as "a DJ, vocalist and multi-instrumentalist, who uses his Boy Eats Drum Machine project to showcase his love of all things percussive."

Discography

2006: Pleasure
2007: Two Ghosts
2008: Booomboxxx
2010: Hoop + Wire
2010: 20 Beats
2012: The Battle
2014: M1

A free EP called fre*e*p is offered to fans on the official website.

References

External links
Official Website

American DJs
American male singers
American multi-instrumentalists
Singers from Oregon
Living people
Year of birth missing (living people)